Glasgow Girls can refer to:
Glasgow Girls (artists), a group of female designers and artists associated with the Glasgow School
Glasgow Girls (activists), a group of young women who highlighted the situation of asylum seekers in Glasgow
Glasgow Girls F.C., a women's association football club
Glasgow Girls, a 2014 TV movie by Brian Welsh